Bernt Hagtvet (born 5 March 1946) is a Norwegian political scientist. He is a professor emeritus of political science at the University of Oslo. Among his areas of interest are European politics, extremist movements and human rights. He was born in Oslo and is married to historian Guri Hjeltnes. He is a member of the Norwegian Academy of Science and Letters. He was among the founders and stayed on as a board member at Human Rights House Foundation. He is now the interim chair of the board.

References

1946 births
Living people
Norwegian political scientists
Norwegian expatriates in the United States
Yale University alumni
Academic staff of the University of Oslo
Members of the Norwegian Academy of Science and Letters
Alumni of Nuffield College, Oxford